Emperor Ai (哀帝; Aidi; "The Lamentable Emperor") may refer to:

Emperor Ai of Han (27BC–1BC, reigned 7BC–1BC), emperor of the Western Han Dynasty
Li Ban (288–334, reigned in 334), brief emperor of the Cheng Han state, also known as Emperor Ai of Cheng Han
Emperor Ai of Jin (341–365, reigned 361–365), emperor of the Eastern Jin Dynasty
Emperor Ai of Tang (892–908, reigned 904–907), emperor of the Tang Dynasty

See also
Aidi (disambiguation)